Robert Austin Huffaker Jr. (born March 7, 1973) is a United States district judge of the United States District Court for the Middle District of Alabama.

Biography 

Huffaker received a Bachelor of Engineering from Vanderbilt University and a Juris Doctor from the University of Alabama School of Law. Huffaker served as a commissioner of the Alabama Securities Commission and as a member of the Alabama Civil Jury Charge Committee.

Federal judicial service 

On July 1, 2019, President Donald Trump announced his intent to nominate Huffaker to serve as a United States District Judge of the United States District Court for the Middle District of Alabama. Huffaker is nominated to the seat vacated by Judge William Keith Watkins, who assumed senior status on January 31, 2019. On July 8, 2019, his nomination was sent to the United States Senate. On July 31, 2019, a hearing on his nomination was held before the Senate Judiciary Committee. On October 17, 2019, his nomination was reported out of committee by a 19–3 vote. On December 3, 2019, the Senate invoked cloture on his nomination by a 88–4 vote. On December 4, 2019, his nomination was confirmed by a 89–4 vote. He received his judicial commission on December 12, 2019.

References

External links 

1973 births
Living people
21st-century American judges
21st-century American lawyers
Judges of the United States District Court for the Middle District of Alabama
Lawyers from Montgomery, Alabama
Vanderbilt University alumni
United States district court judges appointed by Donald Trump
University of Alabama School of Law alumni